The Ilha do Tumba Extractive Reserve is an extractive reserve in the state of São Paulo, Brazil.
It protects an area of mangroves and supports a traditional extractive population.

Location

The Ilha do Tumba Extractive Reserve is in the municipality of Cananéia, São Paulo.
The reserve is on the border between the states of São Paulo and Paraná.
It adjoins the Itapanhapima Sustainable Development Reserve to the east.
The reserve contains a well-preserved area of mangroves, and holds sambaquis that are among the oldest archaeological sites on the south coast.
It has the objective of conserving this area of the Lagamar and supporting crab collection and fishing by the local communities.
It also provides the raw material used to make fish traps, an economically important traditional caiçara technique.

History

The Ilha do Tumba Extractive Reserve was created by state law 12.810 of 21 February 2008.
This law broke up the old Jacupiranga State Park and created the Jacupiranga Mosaic with 14 conservation units.
It is administered by the state forestry foundation (Fundação para Conservação e a Produção Florestal do Estado de São Paulo).

Notes

Sources

Extractive reserves of Brazil
Protected areas of São Paulo (state)
Protected areas established in 2008
2008 establishments in Brazil